High School Heroes is a young adult novel by American author James Mascia originally published in September 2010 by a small press publisher L&L Dreamspell.

The story is about a young girl named Christine Carpenter, who on her first day of her sophomore year at Thomas Jefferson High School, discovers she has the amazing ability to read the minds of others. At first, she thinks she is cursed with these powers but eventually comes to terms with them and becomes a superhero. The story is one of the few novels written about superheroes that is not a comic book. The novel is essentially a book about heroism and it teaches the values of being a hero even to those without powers.

Plot
On Christine Carpenter's first day of her sophomore year at Thomas Jefferson High School she makes a startling discovery. She can hear peoples’ thoughts. After convincing herself she's not going crazy, Chris must learn to control her amazing mind-reading ability.  Using her power she quickly realizes her crush, the captain of the football team, is also blessed with a special ability. She is soon sucked into a world she never thought possible when two more of her classmates, and a teacher, turn out to have powers as well. What are they meant to do with their special gifts that can either help, or harm others?  Christine soon finds out when a monster, lurking in the depths of her school, threatens to murder the student population. When it becomes apparent that the creature is someone she knows, she must decide whether to try and save him, or destroy the beast. It is a difficult choice, but one that ultimately takes her from being an ordinary high school student to being a hero. With this, Christine learns that being a hero doesn't mean having superpowers, it is ultimately the decisions she makes that are the distinguishing factors.

Supplementary work
High School Heroes also has some supplementary stories published in comic book form on WeVolt.com. The stories contained here focus more on the minor characters of the novel, such as Savanah Stephenson and Bobby Barnes.

Themes
One of the major themes of High School Heroes is that it is the actions of the individual that makes them a hero, and that even small actions can make a person a hero in the eyes of others. This theme is most exemplified in the novel during the scene where Christine Carpenter and Ethan Everett help a man who dresses as a superhero, but has no powers, Captain Falcon, distribute toys to needy children. Another great theme is the idea that power does corrupt and that a person must fight against that corruption. During the novel, Christine finds herself losing her friends because she is using her mind control powers to influence them. Once she realizes the error of her ways, it is difficult for her to control herself again.

Origins
James Mascia says that he got the inspiration to write this story when he had a conversation at Comic Con with someone about how there were very few superhero stories published outside of the comic book or graphic novel genre. So, he set out to write a story that was just that: a superhero story that had no ties to a comic. He then created the character of Christine Carpenter, and decided she would have not only the ability to read minds, but also be able to show people their greatest fears. The original story of Christine was published in the magazine A Thousand Faces, a journal of superhuman fiction.

After having several stories about Christine and her friends published in A Thousand Faces, Mascia decided it was time for them to take on a larger adventure, and in October 2008 set out to write a novel. The novel took nearly nine months to write and another five months of editing before finally sending it out to publishers. After many rejections, Mascia sold the manuscript of High School Heroes to L&L Dreamspell. Nearly a year later, the book was published.

External links
The stories contained within the High School Heroes novel are retold in graphic form on this site.
L&L Dreamspell Official Website 
L&L Dreamspell - High School Heroes
Fallen Angel - James Mascia Interview
Maryland Independent - James Mascia Interview
A Thousand Faces - Official Website

2010 American novels
American young adult novels
Superhero novels
Novels set in high schools and secondary schools
2010 children's books